California Poppy is the third album by California band OPM, released on July 18, 2006. It spawned two music videos: "For Tonight" and "Rock Me Slow".

Track listing
 "Intro" - 0:30
 "For Tonight" - 3:43
 "Lion's Pride" - 5:01
 "Rock Me Slow" - 3:53
 "Love Don't" - 3:08
 "Somewhere (Further Than The Valley)" - 4:22
 "Desire" - 4:24
 "Right Now" - 4:21
 "Leave 'em For Dead" - 4:42
 "Interlude" - 0:25
 "Voodoo Hex" - 3:09
 "That's The Sound" - 4:31
 "Born Again Virgin" (Contains hidden track "For Tonight (remix)") - 9:00

Band Line-up
John E. Necro - Lead Vocals
Big B - Rapping
Geoff Turney - Guitar
Jonathan Williams - Keyboards
Matt Rowe - Bass
Robert aka The Skatanic Mechanic Bradley - Drums

References

OPM (band) albums
2006 albums
Suburban Noize Records albums